Sheboygan Falls High School is a public high school located in Sheboygan Falls, Wisconsin. It serves students in grades 9 through 12. The school colors are purple and gold and they are referred to as the "Falcons."

Sports
The school offers many sports such as baseball, basketball, cross country, football, golf, soccer, softball, tennis, track and field, and volleyball.

The school has a strong history of successful sports teams. Sheboygan Falls has claimed 6 WIAA state championships and 3 Runner Up trophies. 
 2000 WIAA Division 3 State Champions in Football. The Falcons cruised to a D3 title finishing the season with a 14-0 record including 11 shut-outs. The Falcons averaged 384.1 rushing yards per game and still hold a D3 state championship game record of 469 rushing yards. Sheboygan Falls football has made the playoffs 24 times since 1985.  Falls has been the top team in the EWC in 2017, 2016, 2015, 2004, 2002, 2001, 2000, 1999, 1997, 1993, 1992, 1990, 1988, 1987, 1985, 1961, 1953, 1952.
 1992 WIAA Division 2 Runner Up in Track. 
 1987 Class B Runner Up in Football. 
 1983 Class B State Champions in Women's Volleyball. 
 1979 Class B State Runner Up in Women's Basketball 
 1975 Class B State Champions in Men's Basketball. 
 1974 Class B State Champions in Men's Basketball. 
 1973 State Champions in Summer Baseball.

Enrollment 
From 2000–2019, high school enrollment declined 16.3%.

Enrollment at Sheboygan Falls High School, 2000–2019

References

Wisconsin Interscholastic Athletic Association

http://msryry.com/falcons/2000/fallsstats200.html

http://www.wiaawi.org/Portals/0/PDF/Results/Football/State_Records/records.pdf

http://www.wiaawi.org/Portals/0/PDF/Results/Football/State_Records/playoffparticipation.pdf

http://www.sheboyganpress.com/story/sports/high-school/football/2015/08/18/past-eastern-wisconsin-conference-football-standings/31960431/

External links 
 Sheboygan Falls High School
 Old Sheboygan Falls High School Yearbook Senior Photos

Public high schools in Wisconsin
Schools in Sheboygan County, Wisconsin